"Say A'" is a song by American rapper A Boogie wit da Hoodie from his debut studio album The Bigger Artist (2017). It was released on September 22, 2017 as the album's second single. The song was produced by Ness and Nick Seeley.

Composition
Kevin Goddard of HotNewHipHop called the song a "light-hearted, catchy street banger". Produced by in-house producer Ness, a label mate of A Boogie wit da Hoodie, the instrumental has a "cheerful" piano loop with "trap drums" playing which appears to be sampled from "Butter Building" from the Nintendo game Kirby's Epic Yarn, along with a faint sound of police siren. A Boogie sings about his experiences of life in the streets and being stopped by police, and what his newfound success has to offer him.

Music video
Directed by Michael Garcia, the accompanying music video was released on January 5, 2018. It begins with A Boogie wit da Hoodie in an argument with a woman before noticing that police have spotted him. He hops into his Mercedes-Benz, which transforms into a Ferrari, with a female model by his side. The visual then alternates between animated and live-action shots, showing the pursuit, which is being televised. Boogie stops his car and leaves the model inside, and makes his way to a staircase and onto a rooftop. He eventually outruns the police, and on his way downstairs, he sees a couple of kids who were watching him on the news the entire time.

Charts

Certifications

References

2017 singles
2017 songs
Atlantic Records singles
A Boogie wit da Hoodie songs
Songs written by A Boogie wit da Hoodie
Trap music songs